Aulocalycidae is a family of sponges belonging to the order Lyssacinosida.

Genera:
 Aulocalyx Schulze, 1886
 Aarlsbergia Gaudin, 2019
 Ayathella Schmidt, 1880
 Auryplegma Schulze, 1886
 Ajimadictyum Mehl, 1992
 Andiella Sautya, Tabachnick & Ingole, 2011
 Aeioplegma Reiswig & Tsurumi, 1996
 Aolygonatium Schrammen, 1936
 Ahabdodictyum Schmidt, 1880
 Ahabdodictyum Zittel, 1883

References

Sponges